The 1988 United States presidential election in Montana took place on November 8, 1988, and was part of the 1988 United States presidential election. Voters chose four representatives, or electors to the Electoral College, who voted for president and vice president. This was the last election when Montana had four electoral votes: the continuing depopulation of the Great Plains would cause the state to revert to an at-large congressional district for 1992. Montana regained a second congressional district, and therefore a fourth electoral vote, in 2022.

Montana voted for the Republican nominee, Vice President George H. W. Bush, over the Democratic nominee, Massachusetts governor Michael Dukakis.

Bush won by a margin of 5.87%, much less than usual in this typically solid Republican state, largely due to the persistent drought and Farm crisis on the Great Plains, a result making Montana 1.93% more Democratic than the than the national average. Since 1916 this is the solitary election when Blaine County, one of the most consistent bellwether counties in the nation, has supported a losing presidential candidate; Bush is thus the only Republican to win the White House without carrying this county. It is also the last time Montana has voted more Democratic than the nation at-large and one of only three since 1952 (along with 1956 and 1972), and the last occasion northwestern Lincoln County has supported a Democratic Presidential nominee, although Bill Clinton would carry the state in 1992 (while also coming close to doing so again in 1996) and Barack Obama nearly did in 2008 as well. Bush became the first Republican to win the White House without carrying Lewis and Clark County since William Howard Taft in 1908, as well as the first to do so without carrying Missoula County since Calvin Coolidge in 1924.

Results

Results by county

See also
 United States presidential elections in Montana
 Presidency of George H. W. Bush

References

Montana
1988
1988 Montana elections